"This too shall pass" is an adage about the temporary nature of existence.

This Too Shall Pass may also refer to:

This Too Shall Pass (The Fold album), 2006
This Too Shall Pass (Tuna album), 2015
"This Too Shall Pass" (OK Go song), 2010
"This Too Shall Pass" (Yolanda Adams song), 2005
"This too shall pass" (composition), a triple concerto by Raminta Šerkšnytė, 2021
 "This Too Shall Pass", a song by  Tay Kewei
 "This Too Shall Pass", a song by Maria Mena